Toby Smith was a keyboardist with the band Jamiroquai.

Toby Smith may also refer to:

Toby Smith (rugby union)

See also
Tobie Smith, swimmer
Thomas Henry Smith (American politician), known as Tobe Smith